Centre Island is a small, uninhabited island  in the Sir Edward Pellew Group of Islands in the Gulf of Carpentaria within the Northern Territory of Australia.

An automated weather station run by the Bureau of Meteorology has been operating on the island since 1968. Temperatures range from 23.8 °C to 31.2 °C and the average annual rainfall is 1053.4 mm.

References 

Islands of the Northern Territory
Gulf of Carpentaria
Uninhabited islands of Australia